Froan or Froøyene is a populated archipelago of small, rocky islands in the municipality of Frøya in Trøndelag county, Norway. The island village of Halten lies at the northern end of the island chain. Only a few of the islands are inhabited, and in 2017, the population was only 38. The Froan Chapel, built in 1904, is located on the island of Sauøya. The Halten Lighthouse and others are located throughout the islands.

References

 
Frøya, Trøndelag
Islands of Trøndelag
Archipelagoes of Norway
Archipelagoes of the Norwegian Sea